General Leach may refer to:

Edward Pemberton Leach (1847–1913), British Army general
George E. Leach (1876–1955), U.S. Army major general
Henry Leach (British Army officer) (1870–1936), British Army brigadier general
William Leach (Canadian Army officer) (1942–2015), Canadian Armed Forced lieutenant general